Boston Dynamics is an American engineering and robotics design company founded in 1992 as a spin-off from the Massachusetts Institute of Technology. Headquartered in Waltham, Massachusetts, Boston Dynamics has been owned by the Hyundai Motor Group since December 2020, but having only completed the acquisition in June 2021.

Boston Dynamics develops of a series of dynamic highly-mobile robots, including BigDog, Spot, Atlas, and Handle. Since 2019, Spot has been made commercially available, making it the first commercially available robot from Boston Dynamics, while the company has stated its intent to commercialize other robots as well, including Handle.

History 
The company was founded by Marc Raibert, who spun the company off from the Massachusetts Institute of Technology in 1992.  The company was an outgrowth of the Leg Laboratory, Raibert's research lab at MIT and Carnegie Mellon University. The Leg Laboratory helped establish the scientific basis for highly dynamic robots.  These robots were inspired by the remarkable ability of animals to move with agility, dexterity, perception and intelligence, and the work there set the stage for the robots developed at Boston Dynamics. Nancy Cornelius was a co-founder of Boston Dynamics, having joined the company as its first employee.  During her time there she served as an officer of the company, did engineering on many contracts, was CFO for 10 years, and later was VP in charge of engineering on several contracts.  She retired after 21 years of service in 2013, when the company was acquired by Google. Robert Playter was also a co-founder of the company, joining a few months later, as soon as he completed his PhD thesis at MIT working with Raibert in the Leg Laboratory. Playter was COO at the company for many years and has been CEO since 2019.

Early in the company's history, it worked with the American Systems Corporation under a contract from the Naval Air Warfare Center Training Systems Division (NAWCTSD) to replace naval training videos for aircraft launch operations with interactive 3D computer simulations featuring  characters made with DI-Guy, software for realistic human simulation. Eventually the company started making physical robots—for example, BigDog was a quadruped robot designed for the U.S. military with funding from Defense Advanced Research Projects Agency (DARPA).

On December 13, 2013, the company was acquired by Google X (later X, a subsidiary of Alphabet Inc.) for an unknown price, where it was managed by Andy Rubin until his departure from Google in 2014. Immediately before the acquisition, Boston Dynamics transferred their DI-Guy software product line to VT MÄK, a simulation software vendor based in Cambridge, Massachusetts.

On June 8, 2017, Alphabet Inc. announced the sale of the company to Japan's SoftBank Group for an undisclosed sum. On April 2, 2019, Boston Dynamics acquired the Silicon Valley startup Kinema Systems.

In December 2020, Hyundai Motor Group acquired an 80% stake in the company from SoftBank for approximately $880 million dollars. SoftBank Group retains about 20% through an affiliate. In June 2021, it was announced that Hyundai officially took a controlling stake in the company from SoftBank.

In October 2022, the company signed a pledge saying it would not support any weaponization of its robotic creations. Boston Dynamics offered other robotics companies to join the pledge with 5 other firms signing as well.

Products

BigDog 

BigDog was a quadrupedal robot created in 2005 by Boston Dynamics, in conjunction with Foster-Miller, the Jet Propulsion Laboratory, and the Harvard University Concord Field Station. It was funded by DARPA in the hopes that it would be able to serve as a robotic pack mule to accompany soldiers in terrain too rough for vehicles, but the project was shelved after BigDog was deemed too loud to be used in combat. Instead of wheels, BigDog used four legs for movement, allowing it to move across surfaces that would defeat wheels.

Cheetah 

A similar but independently developed robot also known as Cheetah is made by MIT's Biomimetic Robotics Lab, which, by 2014, could jump over obstacles while running. By 2018 the robot was able to climb stairs.

LittleDog 
Released around 2010, LittleDog is a small quadruped robot developed for DARPA by Boston Dynamics for research. Unlike BigDog, which is run by Boston Dynamics, LittleDog is intended as a testbed for other institutions. Boston Dynamics maintains the robots for DARPA as a standard platform.

LittleDog has four legs, each powered by three electric motors. The legs have a large range of motion. The robot is strong enough for climbing and dynamic locomotion gaits. The onboard PC-level computer does sensing, actuator control and communications. LittleDog's sensors measure joint angles, motor currents, body orientation and foot/ground contact. Control programs access the robot through the Boston Dynamics Robot API. Onboard lithium polymer batteries allow for 30 minutes of continuous operation without recharging. Wireless communications and data logging support remote operation and data analysis. LittleDog development is funded by the DARPA Information Processing Technology Office.

PETMAN 
PETMAN (Protection Ensemble Test Mannequin) is a bipedal device constructed for testing chemical protection suits. It is the first anthropomorphic robot that moves dynamically like a person.

LS3 

Legged Squad Support System (LS3), also known as AlphaDog, is a militarized version of BigDog. It is ruggedized for military use, with the ability to operate in hot, cold, wet, and dirty environments. 

According to Lt. Col. Joe Hitt and the US Marine Corps's program manager "The vision for LS3 is to combine the capabilities of a pack mule with the intelligence of a trained animal". LS3 is capable of reacting to visual or oral commands and uses an on board GPS system, along with computer vision (LIDAR and IR), to guide itself through terrain. Due to its ability to track oral commands, soldiers within the field found it difficult to hold a conversation with this bot in a vicinity because it would unknowingly follow commands not given to itself. Unlike its living counterparts, LS3 can march for 20 miles (32 km) before running out of fuel. The robot also doesn't suffer from the shortcomings of bleeding and falling over, a problem with many pack mules.

Atlas 

The Agile Anthropomorphic Robot "Atlas" is a 5-foot (152.4 cm) bipedal humanoid robot, based on Boston Dynamics' earlier PETMAN humanoid robot, and designed for a variety of search and rescue tasks.

In February 2016 Boston Dynamics published a YouTube video entitled "Atlas, The Next Generation" showing a new humanoid robot about 5' tall (152.4 cm). In the video, the robot is shown performing a number of tasks that would have been difficult or impossible for the previous generation of humanoid robots.

A video posted to the Boston Dynamics channel of YouTube dated October 11, 2018, titled "Parkour Atlas", shows the robot easily running up 2' high steps onto a platform. Atlas is shown in a September 2019 YouTube video doing "More Parkour".

Spot

On June 23, 2016, Boston Dynamics revealed the four-legged canine-inspired Spot which only weighs 25 kg (55 pounds) and is lighter than their other products.

In November 2017, a promotional video of the Spot using its forward claw to open a door for another robot reached #1 on YouTube, with over 2 million views. A later video the same month showed Spot persisting in attempting to open the door in the face of human interference. Viewers perceived the robot as "creepy" and "reminiscent of all kinds of sci-fi robots that wouldn't give up in their missions to seek and destroy".

On May 11, 2018, CEO of Boston Dynamics Marc Raibert on TechCrunch Robotics Session 2018 announced that the Spot robot was in pre-production and preparing for commercial availability in 2019. On its website, Boston Dynamics highlights that Spot is the "quietest robot [they] have built." The company says it has plans with contract manufacturers to build the first 100 Spots later that year for commercial purposes, with them starting to scale production with the goal of selling Spot in 2019. However, in September 2019, journalists were informed that the robots will not be sold, but they will be given on lease to selected business partners. In November 2019 Massachusetts State Police became the first law enforcement agency to use Spot as a robot cop, as well as in the unit's bomb squad.

Since January 23, 2020, Spot's SDK is available for anyone via GitHub. It will allow programmers to develop custom applications for Spot to do various actions that could be used across different industries.

On June 23, 2020, a lone Spot named 'Zeus' was used by SpaceX at their Boca Chica Starship Test Site to help contain sub-cooled liquid nitrogen and to inspect 'potentially dangerous' sites at and around the launchpad.

On July 9, 2020, a team of Spot robots performed as cheerleaders in the stands at a baseball match between the Fukuoka SoftBank Hawks and the Rakuten Eagles, backed by a team of SoftBank Pepper Robots.

Spot performed inspection tasks on the Skarv floating production storage and offloading vessel in November 2020.

On April 9, 2021 Michael Reeves made a Youtube video where he attached a pressurized beer canister and phallic nozzle in order to detect red plastic cups and dispense beer into them.

On March 18, 2022, artist Agnieszka Pilat sold a painting created by Spot for $40,000 at the home of Brian Boitano to benefit Ukrainian refugees. The painting, titled "Sunrise March," was created by applying paint on Spot's feet and having the robot rotate in circles.

Handle 
Handle is a research robot with two flexible legs on wheels and two "hands" for manipulating or carrying objects. Handle uses many of the same dynamics, balance and mobile manipulation principles found in the other robots by Boston Dynamics but, with only about 10 actuated joints, it is significantly less complex.

Stretch 
On March 29, 2021, Boston Dynamics announced via a video on their YouTube channel the Stretch robot that was designed for warehouse automation. The machine was able to lift up to 50 pound objects using a suction cup array.

Pick
Pick is a robot just like Stretch but fixed in a particular place. It is designed to carry boxes. It can identify a box in less than a second. It automatically disposes of the sheet of cardboard.

Factory Safety Service Robot 
The Factory Safety Service Robot was unveiled on September 17, 2021. It was the first joint venture with Hyundai Motor Group. The robot is based on the existing Boston Dynamics robot Spot. Its integrated thermal camera and 3D LiDAR system help detect nearby people, monitor fire hazards, and recognize open and closed doors.

In popular culture 

 "Metalhead", a 2017 episode of Black Mirror, features killer-robot dogs resembling, and inspired by, Boston Dynamics robot dogs.
 In June 2019, a parody video went viral across social media in which a robot resembling Atlas was abused, before turning on its human attackers. The video turned out to be the work of Corridor Digital, who used the watermark "Bosstown Dynamics" instead of "Boston Dynamics". This video tricked many people, causing them to believe it was real.
 In Heroes of the Storm (2015), a multiplayer video game by Blizzard Entertainment, playable heroes are able to move quickly through the battleground by using a mount called "Project: D.E.R.P.A.", which references one of Boston Dynamics' quadrupedal robots.
 The HBO Show Silicon Valley has made two prominent references to the company ‒ an episode featured a robotics company called Somerville Dynamics, named after Somerville, a city that neighbors Boston; and the season premiere of Season 3 featured a real Boston Dynamics Spot robot, seen crossing a street.
 In 2022 the Spot robot was featured as a background extra in an episode of The Book of Boba Fett TV series.

See also
Biomimetics
List of robotic dogs

References

External links 

 Official website

University spin-offs
 
Robotics companies of the United States
Technology companies based in the Boston area
Manufacturing companies based in Massachusetts
Companies based in Waltham, Massachusetts
American companies established in 1992
Manufacturing companies established in 1992
Technology companies established in 1992
1992 establishments in Massachusetts
Softbank portfolio companies
Discontinued Google acquisitions
Alphabet Inc.
Hyundai Motor Group
2013 mergers and acquisitions
2017 mergers and acquisitions
2021 mergers and acquisitions
American subsidiaries of foreign companies